Aigars Fadejevs (born December 27, 1975) is a former Latvian athlete, competing in 20 km, 50 km walk and marathon running, and a rehabilitologist for sprinters.

Fadejevs competed in 1996 Summer Olympics, finishing 6th in the 20 km walk and in the 2000 Summer Olympics, winning the silver medal in 50 km, 2004 Olympics, 50 km 11th, 20 km 9th. He also won a gold medal in the European U23 Championships in 1997, a silver medal in the 1998 European Championships at the 20 km distance, and finished 4th in 50 km at the World Championships in Edmonton in 2001.

Fadejevs quit race walking 2004 and competed as a marathon runner,  He almost qualified for the 2008 Olympic Games in Beijing. He currently works as a sports therapist.

His personal records are 1:19:36 in the 20 km walk and 3:43:18 in the 50 km walk, and 2:18:19 in the marathon. He also holds the unofficial world record of 58:23 in the rare 15 km walk distance.

Achievements

References

External links
 

1975 births
Living people
People from Valka
Olympic athletes of Latvia
Athletes (track and field) at the 1996 Summer Olympics
Athletes (track and field) at the 2000 Summer Olympics
Athletes (track and field) at the 2004 Summer Olympics
Olympic silver medalists for Latvia
Latvian male racewalkers
European Athletics Championships medalists
Olympic silver medalists in athletics (track and field)
Latvian male marathon runners
Medalists at the 2000 Summer Olympics
Latvian people of Russian descent